Rodolfo González may refer to:

 Rodolfo González Pacheco (1882–1949), Argentine writer, playwright, orator, anarchistic journalist and activist
 Rodolfo González (boxer) (born 1945), Mexican boxer
 Rodolfo González Rissotto (born 1949), professor of Uruguayan history and politics
 Rodolfo González (golfer) (born 1967), Argentine professional golfer
 Rodolfo González (racing driver) (born 1986), Venezuelan racing driver.
 Rodolfo González Aránguiz (born 1989), Chilean footballer

See also
 Rodolfo Gonzales (1928–2005), Mexican American boxer, poet, and political activist